The Joseph Lothrop House is a historic house in Westborough, Massachusetts.  It is listed on the National Register of Historic Places as being in the "Shrewsbury vicinity", but Massachusetts cultural inventory identifies its location in Westborough.

The Federal style house was built in 1825 and added to the National Register of Historic Places in 1980.

History

The home was built by Joseph Lothrop, the brother-in-law of Nathan A. Fisher, whose house is across the turnpike. The home is located very close to the center of Wessonville, which was the center of town activity at the time. While built as a residential home, the property was renovated and became a restaurant (Bergson's).

In 2013 the home became the corporate headquarters for Penta Communications.

See also
National Register of Historic Places listings in Worcester County, Massachusetts

References

Houses in Worcester County, Massachusetts
Buildings and structures in Westborough, Massachusetts
Houses on the National Register of Historic Places in Worcester County, Massachusetts